Rossburn Municipality is a rural municipality (RM) in the Parkland Region of Manitoba, Canada.

It was named for Reverend Richard R. Ross, an early settler to the region.

History

The RM was incorporated on January 1, 2015, via the amalgamation of the RM of Rossburn and the Town of Rossburn. It was formed as a requirement of The Municipal Amalgamations Act, which required that municipalities with a population less than 1,000 amalgamate with one or more neighbouring municipalities by 2015. The Government of Manitoba initiated these amalgamations in order for municipalities to meet the 1997 minimum population requirement of 1,000 to incorporate a municipality.

Communities
Birdtail
Olha
Rossburn
Vista

Demographics 

References 

Rural municipalities in Manitoba
2015 establishments in Manitoba
Manitoba municipal amalgamations, 2015
Populated places established in 2015